Remember That You Will Die is the fourth studio album by American rock band Polyphia, released on October 22, 2022, by Rise Records. It debuted at number 33 on the Billboard 200 chart and number one on the Top Hard Rock Albums chart.

Track listing

Personnel
Polyphia
 Tim Henson – guitar
 Scott LePage – guitar
 Clay Gober – bass guitar
 Clay Aeschliman – drums

Featured musicians
 Brasstracks – trumpet (1, 8, 12)
 Anomalie – keyboards and synths (3)
 Sophia Black – vocals (5)
 Killstation – vocals (6)
 Snot – vocals (7)
 Lil West – vocals (10)
 Chino Moreno – vocals (11)
 Steve Vai – guitar (12)

Additional musicians
 Rafa Rodriguez – additional guitar (4), saxophone (1)
 Brady Watt – additional bass (1)
 Luke Holland – additional drums (1, 6)

Production
 Tim Henson – production (all tracks)
 Scott LePage – production (all tracks except 8)
 Judge – production (1, 2, 4, 6, 7, 10, 11)
 Johan Lenox – production (2, 6, 7, 10)
 Ari Starace – production (2, 5)
 Lophiile – production (1)
 Wes Hauch – production (2)
 No Trust – production (2)
 Anomalie – production (3)
 Y2K – production (4, 10)
 Brasstracks – production (8)
 Sims Cashion – production (9)
 Rio Levya – production (7)
 Ivan Jackson – production (12)
 Luke Holland, Brady Watt – production collaboration (9)
 Zakk Cervini – mixing
 Nik Trekov – mixing assistant
 Nick Sampson – drum engineering (1, 2, 3, 4, 6, 7, 10, 11)
 Sean Kellett – drum engineering (1, 6, 7, 9, 10)
 Bryce Butler – drum engineering (5)
 Chris Athens – mastering

Charts

References

2022 albums
Polyphia albums
Rise Records albums